C. Frank Genins (November 2, 1866 – September 30, 1922) was a Major League Baseball utility player who played for three seasons. He played for the Cincinnati Reds and St. Louis Browns in 1892, the Pittsburgh Pirates in 1895, and the Cleveland Blues in 1901. His nickname was Frenchy.

Genins' minor league stints include the Omaha Omahogs in 1887 and 1901 through 1903, the Denver Mountain Lions in 1888, the Sioux City Cornhuskers from 1888 until 1891 and again in 1894, the Indianapolis Hoosiers in 1892, the Grand Rapids Rippers in 1896, the Columbus Buckeyes from 1896 until 1899, the Cleveland Lake Shores in 1900, The Oklahoma City Mets in 1905, the St. Joseph Packers in 1906, the Dubuque Dubs from 1907 until 1908 and the Racine Belles in 1909.

Genins managed the St. Joseph Packers'' in 1906, the Dubuque Dubs in 1907 and the Freeport Pretzels in 1909.

External links

1866 births
1922 deaths
Cincinnati Reds players
St. Louis Browns (NL) players
Pittsburgh Pirates players
Cleveland Blues (1901) players
19th-century baseball players
Omaha Omahogs players
Sioux City Corn Huskers players
Denver Mountain Lions players
Denver Mountaineers players
Indianapolis Hoosiers (minor league) players
Columbus Buckeyes (minor league) players
Columbus Senators players
Grand Rapids Rippers players
Grand Rapids Gold Bugs players
Grand Rapids Furnituremakers players
Cleveland Lake Shores players
Omaha Indians players
Oklahoma City Mets players
St. Joseph Packers players
Hutchinson Salt Packers players
Dubuque Dubs players
Racine Belles (1909–1915) players
Minor league baseball managers
Freeport Pretzels players